is a professional Japanese baseball player. He is a pitcher for the Hokkaido Nippon-Ham Fighters of Nippon Professional Baseball (NPB).

References 

1998 births
Living people
Baseball people from Aichi Prefecture
Nippon Professional Baseball pitchers
Hokkaido Nippon-Ham Fighters players